Namma Annachi is a 1994 Indian Tamil-language film directed by Dhalapathi. The film stars R. Sarathkumar in a triple role, along with Raadhika, Heera Rajagopal and Rupini. It was released on 21 May 1994.

Plot

Ayya was an honest police officer in a remote village. The villagers respected him for protecting the village against the heartless don Vaiyapuri. Ayya lived happily with his wife and son Annachi. One day, Vaiyapuri killed Ayya and his wife in front of Annachi. In turn, the young Annachi stabbed Vaiyapuri and fled to the city.

20 years later, Annachi did odd jobs for a living and eventually became a brave man who fought against injustice. He was adopted by an old couple. Meanwhile, Vaiyapuri controlled the city. Annachi began to work in Vaiyapuri's factory but realised the factory paid the labourers less than expected. Gayathri, a labour officer, came to support the labourers, but Vaiyapuri sent her to jail for prostitution. Later, Annachi and Gayathri got married. During a strike, Annachi saw Vaiyapuri trying to kill the strikers, so Annachi killed him.

20 years later, Annachi becomes a godfather who helped the poor and oppressed, while Annachi's only son Prabhakaran becomes a lawyer. Prabhakaran and Priya fall in love with each other. Vadivelu, who was Vaiyapuri's right-hand, is now a corrupt politician. At the election, all citizens vote for the non-candidate Annachi, thus cancelling the election. An angry candidate poisons poor persons during Annachi's fest, and Annachi kills him. His son Prabhakaran witnesses the murder, and the matter is taken up in court by him, and he wants to punish his father. Annachi is later discharged. Soon, Annachi clashes with Vadivelu, and Vadivelu kills Gayathri. What transpires later forms the crux of the story.

Cast

R. Sarathkumar as Ayya, Annachi and Prabhakaran
Raadhika as Gayathri
Heera Rajagopal as Priya
Rupini as Ayya's wife
Radha Ravi as Vadivelu
Mohan Natarajan as Vaiyapuri
R. Sundarrajan
S. S. Chandran as Annachi's adoptive father
Ganthimathi as Annachi's adoptive mother
Vivek as Nallathambi
Charuhasan as Priya's father
Thyagu
Mahanadi Shankar as Thangapandi
MRK
Madhan Bob
Mohan V. Ram
Kullamani
Veeraraghavan
Dharini
Padmasri
Usha
Krishnamoorthy
Master Parthiban
Manager Cheena
Rani as item number "Enna Dappu Partyinnu"

Soundtrack

The soundtrack was composed by Deva, with lyrics written by Vaali and Kalidasan.

Reception
K. Vijiyan of New Straits Times criticised the director Dhalapathi: "his inexperience shows with his matter-of-fact handling of even the most important events and dialogues with poor use of the cameras" and stated, "to do all three roles is just to generate more publicity for Sarath and the movie". The critic advised the film for only ardent Sarathkumar fans. Malini Mannath of The Indian Express criticised Sarathkumar's performance in the film due to "his difficulty in emoting" and criticised the director for putting "unnecessary strain on him". R. P. R. of Kalki also gave a negative review calling it a concern for filmmakers to take revenge on fans.

References

External links 
 

1990s Tamil-language films
1994 films
Films scored by Deva (composer)